Nancy Charton Ph.D (1920 – 2015) was the first female ordained priest in the Anglican Church of Southern Africa.

Charton was a lecturer and later associate professor in the Department of Politics at Rhodes University. She was also a deacon at St Bartholomew's Church, Grahamstown. In September 1992 she was ordained priest by David Russell in the Grahamstown Cathedral.

Works

References

External links
A Sermon preached to celebrate twenty years of the Ordination of Women to the Priesthood by the Rev'd Prof. Nancy Charton
St Bartholomew's Church, Market Street, Grahamstown
Collected texts at Cory Library

2015 deaths
20th-century South African Anglican priests
1920 births
Academic staff of Rhodes University
Place of birth missing
South African women academics
Women Anglican clergy